John Crosby (May 18, 1912 – September 7, 1991) was an American newspaper columnist, radio-television critic, novelist and TV host. After winning a Personal Peabody Award for his radio criticism in 1946, he became  a member of the Peabody Awards Board of Jurors, serving from 1947 to 1962. During the 1950s, he was generally regarded as the leading critic of television.

Early life
Crosby was born in Milwaukee, Wisconsin, the son of Fred G. Crosby and the former Edna Campbell. His father was in the insurance business. After graduating from New Hampshire's Phillips Exeter Academy, Crosby attended Yale but left without a degree. In 1933, he was a reporter with The Milwaukee Sentinel, moving on to The New York Herald Tribune (1935–41).

Radio
During World War II, he spent five years with the Army News Service, rising to the rank of captain. In the post-war years, he returned to the Herald Tribune and began writing about radio, widening his horizon to television in 1952. That same year, his book-length collection of columns, Out of the Blue, was published, prompting Lewis Gannett to comment: "Crosby is at his best when he engages in the art of amiable murder. He can, by his special personalized art of denunciation, make the most brainless radio program interesting, at least in its death pangs. He slays with zest."

Crosby once observed, "A radio critic is forced to be literate about the illiterate, witty about the witless and coherent about the incoherent."

Television
Crosby was known for his literate, caustic remarks about the television industry. One of his most notable quotes came upon the cancellation of Edward R. Murrow's television series See It Now: "See it Now... is by every criterion television's most brilliant, most decorated, most imaginative, most courageous and most important program. The fact that CBS cannot afford it but can afford Beat the Clock is shocking."

Crosby was so highly respected that he became one of the first media critics to host a television show: the Emmy-winning anthology series The Seven Lively Arts, on CBS. Telecast on Sunday afternoons, it lasted a single season, from late 1957 to early 1958, with individual episodes on such subjects as jazz, ballet and films. The program was notable for showcasing the first (albeit heavily abridged) telecast of Tchaikovsky's ballet The Nutcracker.

From 1965 to 1975 he was a columnist for the British weekly, The Observer. He married Mary B. Wolferth in 1946, and they divorced in 1959. His second wife, the former Katharine J. B. Wood, was a former fashion editor of Edinburgh's The Scotsman. He had two children with Katharine and two children with Mary. His children with Katharine are named Alexander and Victoria and his children with Mary are Margaret and Michael. In 1977, he moved to a farm outside Esmont, Virginia, and turned to writing suspense novels, including Men in Arms (1983). He died of cancer in 1991 in Esmont.

Books 
Among those he wrote:
 Out Of the Blue  (1952)
 With Love And Loathing (1963)
 Never Let Her Go (1970)
 Contract On the President (1973)
 Affair Of Strangers (1975)
 Nightfall (1976)
 The Company Of Friends (1977)
 Snake (1977
 Dear Judgment (1979)
 Party Of the Year (1980)
 Penelope Now (1981)
 Men In Arms (1983)
 Take No Prisoners - an Horatio Cassidy Adventure (1985)
 The Family Worth (1987)
 Party Of the Year With Excerpts From the Legend Of the Di Castigliones Annotated

References

External links
 American Experience
John Crosby on Betty White

1912 births
1991 deaths
Writers from Milwaukee
Military personnel from Wisconsin
Phillips Exeter Academy alumni
Yale University alumni
American television critics
Radio critics
20th-century American non-fiction writers
20th-century American novelists